Routley is a surname. Notable people with the surname include:

Bill Routley, Canadian politician
Doug Routley, Canadian politician
Erik Routley (1917–1982), English composer and musicologist
Hugh Routley (born 1940), Australian rules footballer
Jane Routley (born 1962), Australian writer